Christa Luding-Rothenburger ( Rothenburger, born 4 December 1959) is a former speed skater and track cyclist. She was born in Weißwasser, East Germany. Luding is one of the few athletes who have competed in both the Summer and Winter Olympic Games, and the first female to win a medal in both the Summer and Winter Games. She is the only athlete to win Winter and Summer Olympic medals in the same year (1988), a feat that is no longer possible due to the staggering of the Winter and Summer Olympic years. In speed skating, she is a two-time Olympic gold medallist, while she is an Olympic silver medallist in cycling.

Biography

Before the German reunification in 1990, Luding competed for East Germany – afterwards for Germany. For more than 10 years, she was one of the world's best sprinters in speed skating. At the World Sprint Championships in speed skating, she became world champion twice (in 1985 and 1988), won silver twice (in 1986 and 1989), and won 4 bronze medals (in 1979, 1983, 1987 and 1992). She has also won the 500 m World Cup 3 times (in 1986, 1988 and 1989) and the 1000 m World Cup once (in 1988).

In 1980, she was convinced by her coach, Ernst Luding (whom she would marry after the 1988 Winter Olympics), to take up cycling during the off-season. First she was told to stick to skating, but finally the president of the East German sports federation gave her permission to enter international cycling competitions. At the 1986 World Cycling Championships, she won track cycling gold in the women's sprint and silver the following year. This made her the second woman (after Sheila Young) to become world champion in both speed skating and cycling. In October 1986, she was awarded a Star of People's Friendship in gold (second class) for her sporting success.

In 1988, she earned the distinction of being the only athlete to win Summer and Winter Olympic medals in the same year. It also made her the first woman, and the third athlete overall, to win a medal in both the Summer and Winter Olympics. At the Winter Games in Calgary, Alberta, Canada, she won the gold medal in the 1000 m speed skating event and silver in the 500 m. Seven months later, she won the silver medal in the (1000 m) sprint in track cycling at the Summer Games in Seoul, South Korea.

After winning a bronze medal at the 1992 World Sprint Championships (in which she was unable to win any of the 4 distances), Luding-Rothenburger ended her speed skating career.

Medals 
An overview of medals won by Rothenburger at important championships she participated in, listing the years in which she won each:

World records 
Over the course of her career, Rothenburger skated 8 world records:

Personal records

See also 
 List of multiple Olympic medalists

References

External links

 Christa Rothenburger at SkateResults.com
 Christa Luding-Rothenburger at DESG (Deutsche Eisschnelllauf Gemeinschaft) 
 Profile at official Olympic Movement website

1959 births
Living people
People from Weißwasser
People from Bezirk Cottbus
East German female cyclists
German track cyclists
German female speed skaters
German female cyclists
Cyclists from Saxony
Olympic speed skaters of East Germany
Olympic cyclists of East Germany
Olympic speed skaters of Germany
Speed skaters at the 1980 Winter Olympics
Speed skaters at the 1984 Winter Olympics
Speed skaters at the 1988 Winter Olympics
Cyclists at the 1988 Summer Olympics
Speed skaters at the 1992 Winter Olympics
Medalists at the 1984 Winter Olympics
Medalists at the 1988 Winter Olympics
Medalists at the 1988 Summer Olympics
Medalists at the 1992 Winter Olympics
Olympic medalists in speed skating
Olympic medalists in cycling
Olympic gold medalists for East Germany
Olympic silver medalists for East Germany
Olympic bronze medalists for Germany
World record setters in speed skating
UCI Track Cycling World Champions (women)